Lotus Magellan is an MS-DOS desktop search package, conceived and developed by Bill Gross and released in 1989 by Lotus Development Corporation, most famous for Lotus 1-2-3. Lotus sold 500,000 copies of Magellan.

Operation
Running under MS-DOS, Magellan would scan the directories and files on a drive or floppy diskettes and create a master index. It was aware of all the various current formats and provided the ability to view files without launching the original applications that created them. Its most powerful feature was fuzzy searching, that connected files by relative frequency of keywords, allowing the user to organize related data no matter where or in what format it existed on the user's computer.

Given this "semantic view" of the user's file system, Magellan not only exposed "hidden meaning" from disparate data, but also facilitated the actual movement of files and directories into a better physical organization. Advertisements that ran for Magellan at the time promised to "Get all your ducks in a row" and showed a picture of a line of obedient rubber ducks.

Fate
Magellan was one of several significant developments from Lotus Software (i.e. "1-2-3", "Notes" and office software for the Apple Macintosh) that, despite significant usefulness and market share, failed to keep the company from becoming another brilliant also-ran. Lotus was acquired by IBM in 1995.  The old MS-DOS Lotus software Magellan, Lotus Agenda, HAL, and Lotus Manuscript have since been released as freeware.

References

External links
Lotus Magellan software depository
MS-DOS - Lotus Magellan Release 2.0, Daniel's Legacy Computer Collections

File managers
DOS software
Magellan